William Merry may refer to: 

William Merry (priest) (1835–1918), English scholar and clergyman
William L. Merry (1835–1911), American diplomat
William E. Merry (1861–1941), American politician
Bill Merry (William Gerald Merry, born 1955), English cricketer